Roger Federer was the defending champion, but lost to Juan Martín del Potro 6–4, 6–7(5–7), 7–6(7–3) in the final.

Seeds

Draw

Finals

Top half

Bottom half

Qualifying

Seeds

Qualifiers

Lucky losers
  Victor Hănescu

Draw

First qualifier

Second qualifier

Third qualifier

Fourth qualifier

References
 Main Draw
 Qualifying Draw

Swiss Indoors - Singles
2012 Davidoff Swiss Indoors